Baryazibash (Baryaźıbaş) is a rural locality (a village) in Kuyanovsky Selsoviet, Krasnokamsky District, Bashkortostan, Russia. The population was 202 as of 2010. There are 3 streets.

Geography 
Baryazibash is located 52 km southeast of Nikolo-Beryozovka (the district's administrative centre) by road. Redkino is the nearest rural locality.

References 

Rural localities in Krasnokamsky District